Spinytail crayfish may refer to:
Procambarus fitzpatricki
Cambarus acanthura

Animal common name disambiguation pages